Tropea is a municipality in the province of Vibo Valentia, in Calabria, Italy.

Tropea is a seaside resort with sandy beaches, located on the Gulf of Saint Euphemia, part of the Tyrrhenian Sea, on Italy's west coast and was named “Most beautiful village in Italy” for 2021.

History
A legend suggests that the town was founded by Hercules when returning from his labours at the Pillars of Hercules (the modern-day Strait of Gibraltar). Graves of Magna Graecian origin have been found near Tropea.

Along Tropea's coast, Sextus Pompey defeated Octavius. The Romans built a commercial port in Formicoli, approximately 3 km south of Tropea.

Main sites

Franciscan monastery
Monastery of Santa Maria dell'Isola
12th century Norman cathedral
Tropea Castle, which was destroyed in 1876

The Virgin Mary of Romania
A painting of the Virgin Mary from around 1330 hangs in the Cattedrale di Maria Santissima di Romania, a church constructed in Tropea in the 12th Century. The painting is known as the Virgin Mary of Romania and is of Byzantine origin.

An unconfirmed story asserts that it was carried aboard a ship sailing from the Eastern Roman Empire, when the boat was driven into the port of Tropea by a storm. After repairing the damage, the captain tried to depart, but the ship could not leave the harbour. The bishop of the city, Ambrogio Cordova, dreamed repeatedly that the Virgin Mary was asking him to keep her in Tropea and to protect her. The bishop gathered officials and citizens and went to the ship, where they took the picture. As soon as the painting was brought to shore the ship allegedly left the town.

The Virgin Mary is said to have appeared to the bishop several times in his dreams, warning him of an earthquake that would devastate Calabria. On 27 March 1638 a bishop organised a penitential procession for the people from Tropea, which meant they were out of harm's way when the earthquake struck.

Other events have been attributed to the Virgin Mary's protection, including Tropea being spared from the worst of the 1783 Calabrian earthquakes and when six bombs fell on the town in Tropea in the Second World War, but failed to explode.

People
 Pasquale Galluppi - philosopher.
 Raf Vallone - actor.
 Albert Anastasia - an American mobster.

Tropea onions
Villages around Tropea produce red onions that are well known in Italy. Cipolle di Tropea ("Tropea onions") have become a synonym in Italy for all red onions.

International relations
 
Tropea is twinned with:

  Zvenigorod, Russia (2013)

References

External links

Pro Loco Tropea - tourist office
Museo Antichi Mestieri
Brief History of Tropea
Photos of Tropea and surrounding areas
Photo Gallery 

Cities and towns in Calabria